Patrick Christian "Pat" Barnard (born 3 July 1981 in Port Elizabeth, Eastern Cape, South Africa) is an English-qualified rugby union player who last played for CA Brive in the Top 14.

Pat Barnard's position of choice is at prop.

Barnard was a member of the South African side that won the 2002 Under 21 Rugby World Championship. His performances in the tournament led to him being made U21 Player of the Year at the IRB Awards.

Barnard represented Western Province in the Currie Cup. The Stormers loaned him to the Cats for the 2003 Super 12 season.

He made 11 appearances for the Stormers in the 2004 Super 12 season, including a semi final defeat to the Crusaders. After making only two appearances for the Stormers in the 2005 Super 12 season, Barnard signed for the Northampton Saints. During his spell at the club Barnard was named in the England Elite Player Squad, qualifying for England courtesy of his mother, who is from Reading. After Saints were relegated in the 2006–07 Guinness Premiership, Barnard signed for London Wasps.

His time at Wasps was interrupted by injuries, although he did play in the final of the 2007–08 Guinness Premiership.

Barnard joined French club CA Brive for the 2009–10 Top 14 season.

References

External links
CA Brive profile (French)
Wasps profile
Northampton Saints profile
BBC – English rugby's young guns

1981 births
Living people
English rugby union players
South African rugby union players
Rugby union players from Port Elizabeth
Stormers players
Northampton Saints players
Wasps RFC players
CA Brive players
Rugby union props
South African people of English descent
Stellenbosch University alumni
Expatriate rugby union players in France
Western Province (rugby union) players
Lions (United Rugby Championship) players
English expatriate rugby union players
English expatriate sportspeople in France